Pauline Nalova Lyonga Egbe is a Cameroonian politician from the Fako division, South West region of Cameroon. She has been the minister of secondary education since the ministerial reshuffle of March 2, 2018.

Biography

Youth and education 
After graduating from the Queen of the Rosary Secondary school Okoyong in Mamfe until 1968, she left for the Cameroon College of Arts Science and Technology in Bambili, where she obtained her GCE A Level (English High School diploma) in 1970. At the University of Yaoundé, she graduated with a bachelor's degree in English literature in 1973. She left Cameroon to pursue her studies in England and obtained a master's degree in African literature from the University of Sheffield. Since 1985, she holds a PhD in English literature from the University of Michigan at Ann Arbor in the US.

Career 
After a long career in university education, during which she held the positions of Director of business, then Vice-Rector, she was appointed rector of the University of Buea on June 29, 2012. She held this position for 5 years until her departure in June 2017 following a presidential decree. A few months later, in November 2017, she was appointed President of the Board of Governors of the Douala General Hospital, a position she held for a few months only, until her appointment on March 3, 2018, to the post of Minister of Secondary Education. She is the author of several publications of African Literature.

References 

Living people
Year of birth missing (living people)
Place of birth missing (living people)
University of Michigan alumni
Women government ministers of Cameroon
Government ministers of Cameroon
Women corporate directors
Education ministers
Alumni of the University of Sheffield
Heads of universities in Cameroon
Women heads of universities and colleges
21st-century Cameroonian women politicians
21st-century Cameroonian politicians